Hippolyte Monplaisir (1821, Bordeaux – 10 June 1877, Besana in Brianza) was a French dancer, choreographer and ballet master.

Choreographies 
 Azelia, or the Syrian Slave (Barcelone 1847 - New York, 24 November 1847)
 A Apparição (Lisbonne 1856)
 L'Île des amours (Bordeaux 1860 - Milan 1861 - Rome 1862 - Brussels 1864 - Palerme 1868)
 La Perle de Florence (Bordeaux, 4 April 1861)
 Benvenuto Cellini (Milan, 24 August 1861)
 Nostradamus (Milan, 21 April 1862)
 Tersicore sulla terra (Milan, 24 May 1862)
 Les Filles du feu (Bordeaux 1864)
 Melina (Rome 1864)
 Crisforo Colombo (Rome 1864 - Turin 1865 - Florence 1872)
 La Fête des voiles (Brussels, 5 September 1864)
 Les Nations (Brussels, 18 September 1864)
 Ka-In-Ka-A (Brussels, 28 May 1865)
 La Devâdâcy (Milan, 27 October 1866 - Florence 1867 - Turin 1870)
 Estella (Milan 1866 - Florence 1867 - Naples 1870)
 La Camargo (Milan, 11 January 1868 - Turin, 14 February 1871 - Venise 1871)
 Brahma (Milan, 25 February 1868 - Madrid 1873 - Palerme 1874 - Vienna 1875 - Gênes 1876)
 La Semiramide del Nord (Milan, 2 January 1869 - Turin, 26 décembre 1869 - Bologne 1871 - Turin 1873 - Florence 1874)
 Tra la veglia ed i sogni (Milan, 16  February 1869)
 La Regina della notte (Turin 1869 - Milan 1870)
 Les Figlie di Chèope (Milan, 31 December 1871 - Florence 1875 - Trieste 1875 - Turin, 3 January 1877)
 La Sirena (Milan, 9 March 1872)
 L'Almèa (Naples 1872)
 Giulio Cesare (Milan, 26 December 1874)
 Lore-Ley (Milan, 4 January 1877)

References

External links 
 Hippolyte and Adèle Monplaisir Oxford references

Entertainers from Bordeaux
1821 births
1877 deaths
French ballet masters
French choreographers
French male ballet dancers
19th-century French ballet dancers